P. Suri Babu, or Puvvula Suri Babu (Telugu: పువ్వుల సూరిబాబు) (22 February 1915 – 12 February 1968), was an Indian actor and singer on stage and cinema. He had a peculiar bold voice and was called Kanchu Kantham Suri Babu.

Early life
Suribabu was born on 22 February 1915 in Bommaluru village of Gudivada taluq, Andhra Pradesh.

Filmography
 Draupadi Vastrapaharanam (1936) (actor and singer)
 Kanakatara (1937) (actor and singer)
 Malapilla (1938) (actor and singer)
 Raithu Bidda (1939) (actor and singer)
 Illalu (1940) (actor and singer)
 Tara Sasankam (1941) (actor and singer)
 Jeevana Mukthi (1942) (actor and singer)
 Shri Krishna Tulabharam (1955) (actor)
 Krishna Leelalu (1959)
 Sri Krishna Rayabaram (1960) (actor, singer and music director)
 Sri Venkateswara Mahatyam (1960) (actor and singer)
 Mahakavi Kalidasu (1961) (producer, actor and playback singer)
 Usha Parinayam (1961) (actor and playback singer)
 Dakshayagnam (1962) (actor and singer)
Somavara Vratha Mahatyam (1963)

References

Luminaries of 20th Century, Potti Sreeramulu Telugu University, Hyderabad, 2005
Nata Ratnalu, Mikkilineni Radhakrishna Murthy, Second print, 2002.

External links
 

1915 births
1968 deaths
Indian male stage actors
Telugu male actors
20th-century Indian male actors
People from Krishna district
Male actors from Andhra Pradesh
Singers from Andhra Pradesh
Male actors in Telugu cinema
Indian male film actors
Telugu playback singers
Indian male playback singers
Male actors in Telugu theatre
20th-century Indian male singers
20th-century Indian singers